Ian McPhee may refer to:
 Ian McPhee, Scottish footballer
 Ian Macphee, Australian politician
 Ian McPhee (computer scientist), co-founder of Watcom